Natalia Vladimirovna Pereverzeva (born 10 November 1988, Kursk) is a Russian model. Pereverzeva won the 2010 Miss Moscow and 2011 Krasa Rossii contests. She also participated in the 2012 Miss Earth and 2009 Miss Russia contests. Pereverzeva participated in the photo shoots for Playboy, Cosmopolitan and Harper's Bazaar. She is also engaged in environmentalism, being a member of the Russian WWF.

Pereverzeva gained some particular media interest due to her Miss Earth essay, critical of Russian politics.

Life
Pereverzeva was born in the family of an economist (father) and an engineer (mother). She graduated as a civil service financier. At the age of 17 Pereverzeva was spotted by scouts of a Moscow model agency. At the 2012 Miss Earth contest she was among the eight finalists and received a golden award in the Miss Earth Ever Bilena Make Up Challenge nomination. In September 2013 Pereverzeva started to anchor the program "Style Icon" on Muz-TV.

Environmental advocacy
Pereverzeva expressed an idea of the reduction of deforestation and the increase of green plantations to protect the ozone layer. She also adopted an Amur tiger.

Miss Earth essay
During the 2012 Miss Earth contest Pereverzeva in her written presentation remarked in particular: "But my Russia is also my poor long, suffering country, mercilessly torn to pieces by greedy, dishonest, unbelieving people. My Russia is a great artery, from which the "chosen" few people are draining away its wealth. My Russia is a beggar. My Russia cannot help her elderly and orphans. From it, bleeding, like from sinking ship, engineers, doctors, teachers are fleeing, because they have nothing to live on. My Russia is an endless Caucasian war". The written presentation was based on an earlier essay by Pereverzeva. In a poll conducted by the Russian newspaper Komsomolskaya Pravda 93% of respondents agreed with Pereverzeva's opinion.

References

External links

1988 births
Living people
People from Kursk
Russian beauty pageant winners
Miss Earth 2012 contestants
Russian environmentalists
Russian women environmentalists
Russian female models
Financial University under the Government of the Russian Federation alumni